Gabriel Gómez (born 4 April 1997) is an Argentinian professional footballer who plays as a midfielder for Nueva Chicago.

Club career
Born in Buenos Aires, Gómez began his career with Nueva Chicago in Primera B Metropolitana, Argentina's third division. He made his debut for the club on 24 May 2014 against Comunicaciones, coming on as a substitute as the club lost 1–0.

Gómez then moved to the United States in 2018 and trained with D.C. United, his father's old club. On 28 January 2020, it was announced that Gómez signed with D.C. United's reserve side, Loudoun United. He made his professional debut for the club on 5 September 2020 against Hartford Athletic. He came on as an 89th-minute substitute for Nelson Martinez as Loudoun lost 2–1. He returned to Nueva Chicago in October 2020.

Personal life
Gómez is the son of former professional footballer Christian Gómez who played for both D.C. United and Nueva Chicago.

Career statistics

Club

References

External links
Profile at the Loudoun United website

1997 births
Living people
Footballers from Buenos Aires
Argentine footballers
Association football midfielders
Nueva Chicago footballers
Loudoun United FC players
People from Loudoun County, Virginia
USL Championship players
Argentine expatriate footballers
Expatriate soccer players in the United States